Marco Beltrame (17th century) was an Italian sculptor of the Baroque period, active mainly in his birthplace, Venice.

References

Italian male sculptors
Italian Baroque sculptors
17th-century Italian sculptors